South Windsor Public Schools is a School District serving the town of South Windsor, Connecticut. It also allows students from Hartford, Connecticut, to attend Timothy Edwards Middle School and South Windsor High School through the open choice program.

High schools
South Windsor High School
Orchard Hill High

Middle schools
Timothy Edwards Middle School
Orchard Hill High

Elementary schools
 Eli Terry Elementary School
 Orchard Hill Elementary School
 Philip R. Smith Elementary School
 Pleasant Valley Elementary School

External links
 Official website

S
South Windsor, Connecticut